Mats Traat (23 November 1936 – 27 June 2022) was an Estonian poet, poetry translator, and author.

Career
Traat was born in Arula, Otepää Parish. He debuted in 1962 with a collection of poetry. He published over 20 anthologies of poetry. His poetry frequently dealt with social commentary and society's adoration for science. His lyrics praised nature and his native country. He also translated poetry from Slavic languages (Polish, Macedonian, Czech).

Traat wrote about the indigenous Estonian population. His central topics were the changes and the developments of Estonian rural life in the course of centuries, with an emphasis on people's ethical choices. In Trees Were, Trees Were Tender Brothers (1979), a young protagonist wages a struggle to keep a farm running, something he never desired to do.

Pasqueflower, Antidote for Sadness (1982/uncensored version 1990) covered the fate of ancient Livonians, conquered and formally aligning with the Christian invaders, while maintaining pagan convictions, and the problems of rural life during the stagnation era Estonian SSR.

Dance around the Steam Boiler (1971; originally a film script, that was finally accomplished in 1988) illustrated with five 'dances' with the portable engine the changes of rural life in half a century. In the movie, filmed during the perestroika era, a sixth 'dance' was added, showing the old age of the main characters on the background of the typical rural scenes of 1980s: industrial and technological developments combined with a reckless destruction of the environment.

Traat's short story, The Cross of Power, won the Friedebert Tuglas Award for Short Prose.

Footnotes

Sources
 Estonian Literature Information Center

External Links
 
 

1936 births
2022 deaths
People from Otepää Parish
Estonian male poets
Estonian male short story writers
Translators to Estonian
20th-century Estonian poets
21st-century Estonian poets
Recipients of the Order of the White Star, 4th Class
Maxim Gorky Literature Institute alumni
20th-century short story writers
21st-century short story writers
20th-century translators
21st-century translators
20th-century male writers
21st-century male writers